Vikas Kalantri is a Hindi actor who has done films such as Dil Bechara Pyaar Ka Mara, where he appeared alongside actor Mallika Kapoor and others. He has also done films such as Nayee Padosan and Jigyaasa.

Personal life
Vikas Kalantri was born on 17 August 1980 in Mumbai. He married TV actress Priyanka Chibber.

Filmography

References

External links
 
 

1978 births
Living people
Male actors from Mumbai
Scindia School alumni
Male actors in Hindi cinema